Acaulospora scrobiculata is a species of fungi in the family Acaulosporaceae. It forms arbuscular mycorrhiza and vesicles in roots. Originally described in Mexico, it is found throughout the world.

External links
Index Fungorum

References 

Diversisporales